The Island Worlds is a novel by Eric Kotani and John Maddox Roberts published by Baen Books in 1987.

Plot summary
The Island Worlds is a novel in which Thor Taggart fights against a political party threatening to take over Earth.

Reception
J. Michael Caparula reviewed The Island Worlds in Space Gamer/Fantasy Gamer No. 82. Caparula commented that "the authors are good storytellers, and there is much in the way of colorful characters, political intrigue, corporate shenanigans, and fast-paced space battles to make it a fun read. Recommended."

Reviews
Review by Trevin Matlock (1987) in Locus, #318 July 1987
Kliatt

References

1987 novels
Baen Books books